Dee Dee Wood (born Audrey Donella on June 7, 1927 in Boston, Massachusetts) is an American choreographer. She is best known for her work on musical films of the 1960s and 1970s.

Biography
Most of her well-known work was in collaboration with Marc Breaux, both in films and for television. Wood and Breaux were married in 1955 and were later divorced.

In 1964-1970, Wood and Breaux were the choreographers for the weekly musical revue "The Hollywood Palace."  She also worked in collaboration with the songwriting duo the Sherman Brothers. She serves as one of the judges for the Emmy Awards (choreography).

Wood appeared on Broadway in Can-Can in 1953 as a performer, and worked as an Assistant to Michael Kidd on L'il Abner (1956) and Destry Rides Again (1959) and was the choreographer (with Breaux) for Do Re Mi (1960).

She currently lives in Cave Creek, Arizona.

Filmography
Sources: Hollywood Reporter; The Guardian; Hollywood.com; TCM 

The Andy Williams Show (1962) TV Series (choreographer) (1962–1963)
Judy and Her Guests, Phil Silvers and Robert Goulet (1963) (TV) (choreographer)
Mary Poppins (1964) (choreographer)
The King Family Show (1965) TV Series (choreographer)
The Sound of Music (1965) (choreographer)
The Happiest Millionaire (1967) (stager: musical numbers)
Chitty Chitty Bang Bang (1968) (choreographer)
Of Thee I Sing (1972) (TV) (choreographer)
The Cher Show (1975) TV Series (choreographer)John Denver and Friend (1976) (TV) (choreographer)Benji's Very Own Christmas Story (1978) (TV) (choreographer)In God We Tru$t (1980) (choreographer)Los Angeles 1984: Games of the XXIII Olympiad: (1984) (mini) TV Series (assistant choreographer)Liberty Weekend (1986) (TV) (choreographer)Beaches (1988) (choreographer)Prop Culture'' (2020) (TV) (herself)

References

External links

Arizona Music & Entertainment Hall of Fame Wood Biography at azmusichalloffame.org

1927 births
Living people
American choreographers
Primetime Emmy Award winners
People from Cave Creek, Arizona